Ardfinnan GAA is a Tipperary GAA club which is located in County Tipperary, Ireland. The club, which competes at county level and in the "South" division of Tipperary GAA, is known by its supporters as "the village". The team's home ground is on the main Ardfinnan to Clonmel road (the R665) just outside the village. The club draws its players and support from the village of Ardfinnan and the neighbouring parishes of Grange and Ballybacon.

Ardfinnan club only plays Gaelic football but the area also has a senior hurling club, Ballybacon-Grange GAA, which is based in Goatenbridge village around three miles from Ardfinnan.

History
Ardfinnan GAA club was formed in 1910. Prior to 1910 local teams had played on the green in Ardfinnan village. At that time the Ardfinnan Woollen Mills had a big influence on the club as many of the players were employed there. Then a junior club, Ardfinnan entered the Tipperary senior championship in 1912 for the first time but were beaten by Fethard. At this time Ardfinnan played in black and white jerseys, and so became known as "the magpies". The colours were then changed to green with a white band and white shamrock; that shamrock still remains on the jerseys to this very day. The club played senior in 1917 and 1918 but due to the War of Independence there was very little football played in the period between 1919 and 1922.	
 
Ardfinnan reached their first South division final in 1927 but were beaten by a Carrick on Suir side that went on to win the County title. In 1928 Ardfinnan had two players on the Tipperary team that beat Kerry in the Munster Senior Football Championship, Ned Lonergan and John O'Leary; to date this was the last time Tipperary beat Kerry in a Munster Championship. The 1960s were Ardfinnan's golden era, in which the club won the county senior title three times and the South senior title five times, including four years in a row.	
 
In November 2005, Ardfinnan won their first county title since 1974 with a 1–5 to 1–4 win against Loughmore-Castleiney in Cashel. That title ended a 31-year famine with a late winning point by player manager Peter Lambert.
 
	
Ardfinnan went on to lose to Nemo Rangers in the 2005 Munster Championship quarter-final on a 0–6 to 1–13 scoreline in Ardfinnan on 13 November.

In November 2011, the club published its official history.

On 14 October 2018, managed by former Tipperary manager John Evans, Ardfinnan reached their first county final since 2005 after an 0–9 to 0–8 win against Loughmore-Castleiney in the semi-final.			
In the final, Ardfinnan lost by 1–15 to 1–7 against Moyle Rovers on 28 October.

Honours
Tipperary Senior Football Championship (8) 
1935, 1939, 1962, 1963, 1964, 1970, 1974, 2005
South Tipperary Senior Football Championship (10) 
1935, 1939, 1961, 1962, 1963, 1964, 1968, 1973, 1974, 2018
Tipperary Junior 'A' Football Championship (2)
1934
(St Finnan's) 1954
South Tipperary Junior 'A' Football Championship (2)
1934
(St Finnan's) 1954
Tipperary Under-21 'A' Football Championship (2)
1963, 1994, 2013
South Tipperary Under-21 'A' Football Championship (8)
1962, 1963, 1964, 1965, 1994, 1995, 1997, 2013
Tipperary Under-21 'B' Football Championship (2)
1992, 2009
South Tipperary Under-21 'B' Football Championship (4)
1987, 1992, 2009, 2015
Tipperary Minor 'A' Football Championship (4)
1961, 1962, 1971, 2009
South Tipperary Minor 'A' Football Championship (9)
1961, 1962, 1969, 1971, 1991, 1994, 1997, 1998, 2009
Tipperary Minor 'B' Football Championship (1)
2001
South Tipperary Minor 'B' Football Championship (3)
1988, 2001,2017

2005 Tipperary Senior Football Champions squad
Eamon Ryan  Tony Ryan, Alan John Lonergan, Kieran O'Brien  Michael Phelan, Hugh Bannon, Cathal Hennessy  Thomas Maher, Lorcan Bannon  Alan O'Gorman, Terry Kearns, John R Murphy  Peter Hally, Peter Lambert, Declan Walsh   Subs Sean Maher for Hennessy; Michael English for O Gorman; James Hackett for Walsh Scorers for Ardfinnan – H Bannon 1–0; P Lambert, P Hally 0–2 each; T Kearns 0–1.

Notable players
Colm O'Shaughnessy
 Billy Hewitt
Willie Barrett
Brendan Cummins
Michael "Babs" Keating
Peter Lambert
John Cummins
Ned Lonergan, 1920s Tipperary player
John O'Leary, 1920s Tipperary player
Michael Phelan
Darragh O Leary

Facilities
In the early 1980s, the club made the decision to purchase their own GAA grounds and in 1983 the decision was made to purchase } of land on the Clonmel Road, work commenced in late 1984. In May 1988, the club's new grounds on the Clonmel road were officially opened. The grounds consisted of a playing field, a covered stand, four changing rooms and a car park for up to 80 cars.

References

External links
Ardfinnan GAA Website
Roll of Honour
Tipperary GAA site
Tipp GAA Archives

Gaelic games clubs in County Tipperary
Gaelic football clubs in County Tipperary